The Research Society of International Law (RSIL) was founded by Mr. Ahmer Bilal Soofi in 1993. RSIL works in policy and research, its mission is to conduct research on the dynamic between Pakistan and its international legal obligations. RSIL is apolitical and unbiased, and conducts dedicated research on a range of important issues of law, both international and domestic. This research supports debates on matter of national importance and provides integral input towards the development of the domestic legal environment.

RSIL's activities are focused on providing specialized advisory services to both non-governmental and governmental organisations. Developing the capacity of various stakeholders in the policy making community. And carrying out research as part of various legal reform initiatives in partnership with numerous different stakeholders at the Federal and Provincial levels.

RSIL also conducts research into a variety of modern legal challenges faced by Pakistan through the Conflict Law Centre (CLC). This unique and specially designated research centre focuses on the function of International Humanitarian Law (the Law of Armed Conflict) in Pakistan.
 
Staffed by a team of researchers in offices in both Lahore and Islamabad, RSIL is the first and largest legal think-tank in Pakistan. RSIL staffers possess a diverse array of specializations in both domestic and international law. This allows the Society to undertake innovative research to provide out-of-the-box solutions for Pakistan. 
The Society also has an in-house legislative drafting team which enables RSIL to apply its proposals into readily implementable options for both Federal and Provincial Governments. RSIL also works extensively with government officials by conducting trainings, workshops, and seminars, giving RSIL a unique role in the development of legal reform for more than two decades.

Mission

RSIL is a tool for the advancement and publicity of international law research and capacity building in Pakistan. It upholds its role as a private sector organisation that is unbiased, apolitical, international law think tank that promotes awareness of international law.

The Society aims to improve the understanding of the importance of Pakistan's international legal commitments. This is essential as greater awareness will assist Pakistan in remaining compliant with its international legal obligations, thus cementing its reputation as a responsible member of the international community.

The environment at RSIL purposefully encourages the development of in-depth, original and wide-ranging research and analysis. RSIL aims to educate and to create an appreciation of international law and its application. It also supports a disciplined approach to the interpretation and implementation of international law.

RSIL has also sought and continues to seek to establish a network of similar organizations within and beyond Pakistan that share its dedication to international law. However, the Society's real asset is its constantly developing team.

History

1980s

The idea for RSIL was developed in the late 1980s when its founder and President Mr. Ahmer Bilal Soofi was pursuing a Master of Laws at the University of Cambridge.

1990s

After returning from the United Kingdom Mr. Soofi registered the Society in 1993 under the Societies Registration Act 1860 in Lahore, Pakistan.

2000s

RSIL acquired permanent premises on Fane Road near the Lahore High Court in March 2003. Though motivated, RSIL's initial team members were first and foremost lawyers employed by Mr Soofi's law firm ABS & Co. In 2004, through a private grant, RSIL was able to hire dedicated research staff.

2010s

In 2011 RSIL established a foothold in Islamabad, within the Islamabad Offices of ABS & Co. The Society's growth led RSIL to move into its own space in 2014. In 2015, RSIL established its first Research Unit, the Conflict Law Centre , under Director, Mr. Oves Anwar. The Centre focuses on the application of International Humanitarian Law in Pakistan. In 2016, RSIL created its second unit by formalizing its capacity building activities under the stewardship of Director, Saad-ur-Rehman Khan.

Technical assistance

Special Advisory Division
RSIL's Specialized Advisory Division operates more like a traditional law firm. RSIL provides legal services in the form of legal opinions, drafting of agreements and supporting negotiations. RSIL has also represented various clients domestically and internationally. Some examples of this include: United Nations in Geneva, before the International Court of Justice (ICJ), the International Centre for the Settlement of Investment Disputes (ICSID), and arbitrations at the International Chamber of Commerce
RSIL also provides support to donor-driven projects by advising on the suitability and legal viability of suggested proposals. Additionally, with regard to the China-Pakistan Economic Corridor (CPEC) RSIL's unique skill set is perfect for advising potential investors and businesspersons on Pakistan's regulatory framework.

International Law Training Centre
An integral part of RSIL's core mandate is the development of the capacity of domestic and international policy makers. From its creation, RSIL has sought to educate and train stakeholders on the importance of the part that international law plays within a state's legal framework. 
As RSIL expanded, it was felt necessary to create a dedicated platform for RSIL's capacity building activities. In June 2016, Mr. Ahmer Bilal Soofi established the International Law Training Centre (ILTC) at RSIL, so as to formalize RSIL's capacity building activities under one roof so to speak. 
To this end, a large space has also been designated within RSIL's Islamabad Office for the ILTC. The ILTC can comfortably fit 35 participants or training attendees.

Conflict Law Centre
The Conflict Law Centre at the Research Society of International Law, Pakistan was established in September 2015 with the aim of studying Pakistan's domestic law applicable to situations of armed hostilities and enhancing the capacity of State actors in relation to the State's international legal obligations under International Humanitarian Law (IHL). 
Against the backdrop of several internal military operations to counter militancy and terrorism in the country, it was felt that a dedicated research unit was urgently needed to assess the effectiveness of domestic law. This included exploring the Constitutional mandate afforded to the Armed Forces of Pakistan under the rubric of Article 245 in relation to ‘actions in aid of civil power’, as well as law enforcement powers available under Pakistan's counter-terrorism laws.

Training courses/community and youth engagement
As mentioned above, one of RSIL's core functions is the dissemination of international law in Pakistan. Increasing the awareness and importance of international amongst both practitioners and students. This includes both classroom style lectures on international law and training in its practical application.
To this end, RSIL conducts a variety of formalized training activities throughout the year.

Annual Fellowship Program
RSIL's annual Fellowship Program is specifically designed for mid-career professionals representing both public and private sector organisations. The week-long course is specifically designed to deliver both theoretical and practical knowledge on international law and its application and implementation in Pakistan. 
Lectures and simulations are conducted by RSIL staff and independent professionals, experts in their fields.
The Fellowship Program is RSIL's longest running training activity and is recognised as a valuable qualification for advanced professionals, especially those involved in policy making.

International Law Certification Course
The International Law Certification Course is a weeklong internship program for students and younger professionals who wish to gain an understanding of international law and in-depth analyses of areas of international law that are significant to Pakistan. The Course, usually conducted in the summer is meant to introduce international law to a whole new crop of professionals just starting out in their careers. It also includes sessions in writing and critical analysis. As with the Fellowship Program, the lectures are given by both RSIL team members and experts from all over the world.

References

Foreign policy and strategy think tanks based in Pakistan
International law organizations